Awakening of the Liar is the fourth album by the Polish death metal band Hate. It was recorded at Hard Studio in Warsaw and Hertz Studio Białystok between October and November, 2002. The material was engineered by Kris Wawrzak at Hard Studio and the Wiesławski Brothers at Hertz Studio. The Wiesławski Brothers also did the mixing and mastering at Hertz Studio, January 2003.

Track listing

Personnel
Hate
 Adam "Adam The First Sinner" Buszko - vocals, guitars
 Piotr "Kaos" Jeziorski - guitars
 Cyprian Konador - bass guitar
 Dariusz "Hellrizer" Zaborowski - drums

Production
 Wojciech & Sławomir Wiesławscy - mixing, mastering, sound engineering
 Krzysztof "Kris" Wawrzak - sound engineering
 Paweł "Blitz" Rosłon - photos 
 Artur Szolc, - artwork concept
 Tomasz "Graal" Daniłowicz - graphic design

Note
 Recorded at Hard Studio, Warsaw & Hertz Studio, Białystok, October/November 2002.

References

2003 albums